The 1988 United States presidential election in Virginia took place on November 8, 1988. All 50 states and the District of Columbia, were part of the 1988 United States presidential election. Virginia voters chose 12 electors to the Electoral College, which selected the president and vice president.

Virginia was won by incumbent United States Vice President George H. W. Bush of Texas, who was running against Massachusetts Governor Michael Dukakis. Bush ran with Indiana Senator Dan Quayle as Vice President, and Dukakis ran with Texas Senator Lloyd Bentsen.

Bush won the election in Virginia with a solid 20-point landslide. Virginia was Bush's twelfth-best state by vote share, and his best state in the South outside the states that seceded before the beginning of the Civil War, confirming Virginia's position as a center of the new Republican South. Bush ran strongly in most parts of the state, but in particular, he cracked 60% in populous Fairfax County, outside Washington, D.C., and got over 2/3 and 3/4 of the vote in the Richmond suburbs of Henrico and Chesterfield, respectively, which contributed to the swelling of his statewide margin. Dukakis did well in Arlington County, the independent cities of Richmond and Norfolk, in Virginia's Black Belt counties, and in some then-traditionally Democratic counties in heavily-unionized southwest Virginia.

The election results in Virginia are also reflective of a nationwide reconsolidation of base for the Republican Party, which took place through the 1980s. Through the passage of some very controversial economic programs, spearheaded by then President Ronald Reagan (called, collectively, "Reaganomics"), the mid-to-late 1980s saw a period of economic growth and stability. The hallmark for Reaganomics was, in part, the wide-scale deregulation of corporate interests, and tax cuts for the wealthy.

Dukakis ran his campaign on a socially liberal platform, and advocated for higher economic regulation and environmental protection. Bush, alternatively, ran on a campaign of continuing the social and economic policies of former President Reagan - which gained him much support with social conservatives and people living in rural areas. Additionally, while the economic programs passed under Reagan, and furthered under Bush and Clinton, may have boosted the economy for a brief period, they are criticized by many analysts as "setting the stage" for economic troubles in the United States after 2007, such as the Great Recession.

The election was very partisan, with over 98% of the electorate voting for either the Democratic or Republican parties, and only 4 candidates on the ballot. Most counties in Virginia turned out for Bush, including the highly populated regions of Virginia Beach and Fairfax County.

, this is the last election in which Northampton County and the independent cities of Martinsville, Fredericksburg, and Hampton voted for a Republican presidential candidate. This is also the last time that a Republican won the majority of the vote in Fairfax County.

Virginia weighed in for this election as 13% more Republican than the national average. This is the most recent presidential election in which a Republican won Virginia by double digits and the last time until 2020 that any candidate won the state by double digits. It is also the last election that Virginia voted to the right of Indiana.

Results

Results by county

See also
 Presidency of George H. W. Bush

References

Virginia
1988
1988 Virginia elections